Besh Darreh may refer to:
 Besh Darreh, North Khorasan
 Bacheh Darreh, North Khorasan
 Besh Darreh, Razavi Khorasan